Articles (arranged alphabetically) related to Eritrea include:

0 - 9 
1913 Asmara earthquake
1915 Asmara earthquake
1993 independence

A 
 Abacheri
 Addis Ababa
 Afar language
 Afar people
 African Union
 Afro-Asiatic languages
 Ascari of Eritrea
 Asmara the capital
 Asmara International Airport
 Asmara-Massawa Cableway
 Asmara Presidential Palace
 Assab International Airport

B 
 Battle of Adowa 1896
 Battle of Keren 1941
 Banking in Eritrea
:Category:Banks of Eritrea
Bank of Eritrea
 Benito Mussolini
 Bahta Hagos
 Beja language
 Beja people
 Bilen language
 Bilen people

C 
 Cinema Impero
 Coffee
 Copt
 Coptic Christian
 Cush
 Cushitic language
 COVID-19 pandemic in Eritrea
 COVID-19 vaccination in Eritrea
 Culture of Eritrea

D 
Dahlak Archipelago
Dawit Isaak
Djibouti

E 
 East Africa
 Economy of Eritrea
 Elections in Eritrea
 Eritrean cuisine
 Eritrea Institute of Technology
 Eritrea
 Eritrean Liberation Front ELF
 Eritrean Orthodox Tewahedo Church
 Eritrean nakfa - national currency
 Eritrean People's Liberation Front EPLF
 Eritrean War
 Ertra, Ertra, Ertra
 Ethiopia

F 
 Ferdinando Martini, first Italian governor
 Fiat Tagliero Building
 Foreign relations of Eritrea

G 
 Geography of Eritrea
 Gibi, former government palace
 Government of Eritrea

H 
 Haile Selassie
 Hanish Islands
 Health in Eritrea
 History of Eritrea
 History of Asmara
 Horn of Africa
 Human rights in Eritrea

I 
 Independence Day (Eritrea)
 Italian Eritreans
 Italian East Africa
 Italian Asmara
 Italian Massaua
 Italy
 Italian Eritrea

J

K 
 Keren, Eritrea
 Keren Subregion
 Kunama people
 Kunama language

L 
 LGBT rights in Eritrea (Gay rights)
 List of museums in Eritrea
 List of political parties in Eritrea
 Locusts

M 
 Marcus Garvey
 Maria Theresa thaler
 Massawa
 Massawa International Airport
 Media of Eritrea
 Music of Eritrea

N 
 Nara language
 Nara people
 National Museum of Eritrea

O 
 OAU
 Opera of Asmara

P 
 Politics of Eritrea
 President of Eritrea

Q

R 
 Railways of Eritrea
 Railway stations in Eritrea
 Rashaida people
 Red Sea

S 
 Saho language
 Saho people
 Schools in Eritrea
 Second Italo-Abyssinian War
 Shifta
 Socotra
 Sudan
 South Sudan
 Sport in Eritrea

T 
 Telecommunications in Eritrea
 Telephone numbers in Eritrea
 Tigre language
 Tigre people
 Tigray-Tigrinya people
 Tigrinya language
 Transport in Eritrea
 Tour of Eritrea
 Tourism in Eritrea

U 
 University of Asmara
 UNESCO world heritage site Capital  Asmara

V 
 Victor Emmanuel III, King of Eritrea from 1900 to 1941

W 
 Wildlife of Eritrea

X

Y

Z 
 Zaptié of Eritrea
 Zerai Derres Square

See also

Lists of country-related topics - similar lists for other countries

 
Eritrea